Cladonia pyxidata or the pebbled cup lichen is a species of cup lichen in the family Cladoniaceae. It is host to the lichenicolous fungus Lichenoconium pyxidatae.

References

pyxidata
Lichen species
Lichens described in 1753
Taxa named by Carl Linnaeus